Adrien Francis Morot (born 1970 in Montreal) is a Canadian makeup artist. He won the Best Makeup and Hairstyling Oscar for The Whale, and received an additional nomination in the same category for the film Barney's Version, and has won the Genie Award for Best Makeup twice for his work on Barney's Version and Cruising Bar 2.

Early career 
Morot had taken on various artistic interests since he was around five years old. He drew creatures inspired by those from monster movies; sculpted casts of his friends Star Wars toys; experimented with plasticine, Styrofoam, and Vaseline to make masks; and was making home movies beginning at the age of twelve. Though originally wanting to get into the film business as a stunt actor, his childhood experiences and a reading of a Fangoria feature about The Thing (1982) is what changed his career path to becoming a visual effects artist.

Morot tried to break in when he was seventeen by working as a prop assistant and storyboardinging for various films made in Quebec. He quickly grew dissatisfied with being on set and the lack of FX work available in the area. At the age of 20, he went to Los Angeles as part of a tour offered by his friend, Jacques. After showing his portfolio to various workers in the effects industry, including Tom Savini (a man he first knew about from reading Fangoria), he quickly garnered six job offers.

Personal life
Morot is married to make up artist Sylvania Yau.

Selected filmography

References

Works cited

External links

Living people
1970 births
Canadian make-up artists
Best Makeup Genie and Canadian Screen Award winners
Best Makeup Academy Award winners